Humanzi were an Irish rock band based in Dublin, Ireland.

Album and singles 
Humanzi released their debut album Tremors on Fiction/SFR on 24 July 2006. It featured the singles "Fix The Cracks" and "Diet Pills and Magazines". Tremors was produced by Chris Vrenna (Nine Inch Nails) and Garreth Mannix.

The band released their single "Bass Balls" from their second album in summer 2009.

Humanzi's second album, Kingdom of Ghosts, was released on 26 February 2010. It was recorded in East Berlin by Rob Kirwan in Funk Haus.

Recent appearances

Festivals 
Over the last two years Humanzi have opened for and toured with bands including the Foo Fighters, The Strokes, The Pixies, Eagles of Death Metal, the New York Dolls, Dirty Pretty Things, Peaches, and White Rose Movement. Humanzi headlined the New Band Stage on the Sunday night of the Oxegen festival in July 2006, made appearances at Reading and Leeds Festivals, The Wireless Festival, CMJ and were invited to play in New York City for Fader Magazine and more recently at the Eurosonic Festival in Groningen, the Netherlands.

Video games
The song "Fix The Cracks" was featured on the Atari video game Test Drive Unlimited, released in 2006.

TV 
TV appearances have included slots on renowned Irish music show Other Voices and The Late Late Show as well as T4 and MTV2's Gonzo.

2007 
Having won a Meteor award which they turned down, in 2006 for "Best New Act", Humanzi were nominated in 2007 for "Best Irish Band". 2007 will see the band spend time in Berlin to record their second album.

Discography

Studio albums

Singles

References

External links
Humanzi's MySpace Page
Humanzi's Moblog
Fiction - Humanzi's record label in the UK
 Charting a cautionary tales of two albums - Irish Times article

Irish alternative rock groups
Musical groups from Dublin (city)
Musical groups established in 2005
Musical quartets
Fiction Records artists